Hernando is a town in Córdoba Province, Argentina.

External links

 Municipal website

Populated places in Córdoba Province, Argentina